Fabio Franchino (born 3 December 1969) is an Italian political scientist, professor at the University of Milan. He is   editor of the Italian Political Science Review and associate editor of European Union Politics. His areas of specialization are EU politics and policy, comparative politics, and policy analysis, and is author of influential publications in these fields.

Early life and academic career
Franchino obtained an undergraduate degree from the University of Brighton, a master's from Universita Commerciale Luigi Bocconi in Milan, and a PhD from the London School of Economics and Political Science. His doctoral thesis, dated 2000, was titled Executive and bureaucratic politics in the European Union: Bureaucratic preferences, executive discretion and procedural control of the European Commission. He started his academic career at the London School of Economics and Political Science  as a class teacher, tutorial fellow, and lecturer between 1997 and 2001. He then moved to University College London where he was lecturer and reader from 2002 to 2007, when he earned his chair at the University of Milan.

Academic service
Franchino was elected president of the European Political Science Association for 2016-2018. He is also treasurer of the Standing Group on the European Union of the European Consortium for Political Research.

Selected works
The Powers of the Union: Delegation in the EU. Cambridge: Cambridge University Press (2007), p. 355. EUSA Award for the best book published in 2007 or 2008.

References

Italian political scientists
European Union and European integration scholars
Academic staff of the University of Milan
Academics of University College London
Academics of the London School of Economics
Alumni of the London School of Economics
Bocconi University alumni
Alumni of the University of Brighton
Living people
1969 births